The Gustmeyer House (Danish: Gustmeyers Gård) is a historic property on Ved Stranden, opposite Christiansborg Palace on Slotsholmen, in central Copenhagen, Denmark. It was built in 1797 to a Neoclassical design by Johan Martin Quist. The Nobel Prize-winning physicist Niels Bohr was born in the building. McKinsey & Company is now based in the building.

History

18th century

The site was made up of two individual properties in the late 17th century:- one of them was No. 207 in the city's East Quarter owned by Henrik Lydersen. The other one was No. 212 owned by assessor and mayor Christen Andersen. The larger property towards the canal was No. 249, and by 1756 owned by merchant Carl Hieronimus Gustmeyer. The smaller property in Admiralgade was No. 243, and by 1756 owned by cooper Christen Larsen but later acquired by Gustmeyer.

The property was after Carl Hieronimus Gustmeyer's death in 1756 passed down to his son Friedrich. The building was destroyed in the Copenhagen Fire of 1795. The current building at the site was completed the following year to design by Johan Martin Quist. Quist was one of a handful of master builders who obtained a near monopoly on the rebuilding of the city after the fire.

19th century

At the time of the 1801 census, Friderich Ludwig Gustmeyer resided in the building with his wife Dorthea Gustmeyer, their daughter Anne Gustmeyer, their son Carl Gustmeyer, and clerk Bengt Julius Lingblom. The property was home to an additional 25 people at the time of the 1801 census, including Justitiarius at Hof- og Stadsretten Carl Wigandt Falbe and Mosses Wessely Junior.

The property was listed as No. 154 in the new cadastre of 1805.  Gustmeyer lost the family fortune during the economic crisis that resulted from Denmark's involvement in the Napoleonic Wars.

A later owner of the property was Nicolai Abraham Holten. He sold it when he was appointed as director of Øresund Custom House in Helsingør in 1839.

The property was later acquired by the textile merchant Anders Ancher who ran his textile business from the premises under the name A. Anckers Manufactur Varelager. At the time of the 1845 census, the property was home to a total of 12 people. Anders Ancker, a textile wholesale merchant, resided with his son, three employees, three apprentices and three servants on the ground floor. Ane Sophie Brown (1768–1855), widow of vice admiral Peter Caspar Wessel Brown (1755–1840), was residing with Eleonora Christine Harboe and two maids on the first floor. Frederik Augs. Clementzen was also living there with them. Balthasar Münter (1797–1867), provost of Holmens Church, resided on the second floor with his wife, two daughters and three maids. Ole Christian Borgen, a merchant, resided with his wife, their five children, his mother-in-law, an employee and two maids on the third floor.

Anders Ancher was, at the time of the 1850 census, residing on the ground floor. Anne Sophie Wessel-Brown and Eleonora Christine Harboe had been joined by Harboe's sister Elisabeth Charlotte Harboe. Anna Margrethe Lange, daughter of the owner of Rødkilde Manor on Funen, was also residing there with them.  Jens Frederik August Clementsen, personal secretary for prince Frederik Ferdinand,  was also a resident on the first floor. The second floor was still occupied by Balthazer Münter and his family.

Former foreign minister Ludvig Nicolaus von Scheele lived in the building from 1868 until 1873. Sally Friedlænders Papirhandel og Kortforlag, a stationery business and publisher of art prints and postcards, was also based in the building from circa 1870. The firm had been taken over in 1860 by Ditmer Firmaet in partnership with the namesake founder's son Vilhelm Friedlænder. It was based at the site until 1903.

The property was acquired in 1873 by the businessman and politician David B. Adler who resided at No. 14 until 1878.

One of Adler's daughters, Ellen (1860–1930), married the physician and physiology professor Christian Bohr (1855–1911) in 1881. Their two sons, the Nobel Prize-winning physicist Niels Bohr and the mathematician Harald Bohr, were both born in the building.

20th century
 

The house was owned by King George I of Greece from 1903 until his assassination in 1913. He was a son of Christian IX of Denmark and Louise of Hesse-Kassel.

The building later served as headquarters for Kjøbenhavns Brandforsikring.

Architecture
 
The Neoclassical building is one of Copenhagen's first examples of a bourgeois residence with free-standing columns.

The property also includes two lateral wings which connect the main wing to a rear wing facing Admiralgade which served as warehouse for Gustmeyer's business. There is also a one-storey building in the central courtyard which dates from the same time as the rest of the complex.

Today
The entire property was refurbished by royal building inspector David Bretton-Meyer for the consultancy McKinsey & Company in 1985–1986. The building is owned today by ATP Properties.

References

Further reading
 Hansen, Mikkel Kristian: Emilius Bærentzen og hans jødiske kundekreds. Rambam - Tidsskrift for 'disk kunst og historie.

External links

 Source
 Københavns Brandforsikring

Houses in Copenhagen
Neoclassical architecture in Copenhagen
Listed residential buildings in Copenhagen
Houses completed in 1797
Johan Martin Quist buildings